PizzaExpress is a British multinational pizza restaurant chain, with over 470 restaurants across the United Kingdom and 100 overseas in Europe, Hong Kong, China, India, Indonesia, Kuwait, the Philippines, the United Arab Emirates, Singapore and Saudi Arabia. It was founded in 1965 by Peter Boizot. In July 2020, the business was taken over by its bondholders under a debt-for-equity swap with previous owner Hony Capital. In November 2020, Hony Capital left the business and the group restructure was completed, helping to cut the casual dining chain's debt by more than £400 million.

History

Founded in 1965 by Peter Boizot, PizzaExpress opened its first restaurant in London's Wardour Street. Inspired by a trip to Italy, Boizot brought back to London a pizza oven from Naples and a chef from Sicily. It was announced in 2020 that the Wardour Street branch would shut, and the site has since closed.

In 1969, jazz performances began at its Dean Street restaurant, London.

PizzaExpress expanded into the Republic of Ireland in 1995 and currently operates 14 restaurants there under the brand name Milano. Additionally, the company owns the brand name Marzano. Originally Marzano was used in countries where the brand name Pizza Express was not available, as with the use of the name Milano in the Republic of Ireland, but it also exists in some territories, such as Cyprus, to differentiate between the restaurants selling primarily pizza and those offering a wider range of non-pizza meals inspired by Italian cuisine. It is also used for a cafe-bar run as an adjunct to the branch of Pizza Express in The Forum in Norwich, "Cafe Bar Marzano".

In 2011, PizzaExpress launched a major rebrand of its UK restaurants, with menu changes, a black and white logo and the widespread use of stripes, both for staff uniforms and for restaurant decor.

In July 2014, the group was sold to the China-based private equity firm Hony Capital in a deal worth £900 million. In 2017, PizzaExpress launched 'PizzaExpress Live'.

In October 2019, PizzaExpress hired financial advisors in preparation for its talks with creditors. The chain had been experiencing financial difficulties arising from a downturn in consumer demand for eating out.

In March 2020, all UK restaurants were forced to close indefinitely due to nationwide lockdown rules introduced by the government to limit the spread of COVID-19. On 28 May 2020, select London restaurants reopened for delivery services as the government began to lift lockdown restrictions. In July, it was announced that "dozens" of the closed restaurants would not be reopening. The restaurant group was reported to have a debt pile of £1.1 billion. The next month, it was announced that the company was set to close around 67 restaurants throughout the UK and also cut 1,100 jobs.

In July 2020, the business was taken over by its bondholders under a debt-for-equity swap with previous owner Hony Capital. It was confirmed in September that 73 of its restaurants would close permanently, including the first ever branch in Wardour Street. In November 2020, the group restructure completed and helped cut the casual dining chain's debt by more than £400 million. A further 23 branches were earmarked for closure in January 2021.

Ownership
PizzaExpress was floated on the London Stock Exchange in 1993 with franchises opening across the UK. UK franchises were then bought back en masse in 1996. TDR Capital and Capricorn Associates then bought the company in 2003 turning it private again. In 2005, PizzaExpress floated on the London Stock Exchange, as part of Gondola Holdings. It was then bought by private equity group Cinven as the Gondola Group in 2007. On 12 July 2014 it was announced that Chinese group Hony Capital had bought PizzaExpress for £900 million.

In July 2020, the business was taken over by its bondholders under a debt-for-equity swap with previous owner Hony Capital. In November 2020, Hony Capital left the business and the group restructure completed, help cutting the casual dining chain's debt by more than £400 million.

Fare
Since its foundation, PizzaExpress has specialised primarily in handmade pizza in the traditional Italian style.

PizzaExpress introduced the lighter pizza Leggera, the first pizza range on the high street that contains around 500 calories.

In 2008, PizzaExpress started a Guest Chef Series with chef Theo Randall, of Theo Randall at InterContinental London, creating exclusive dishes for its menu. Francesco Mazzei, of L'Anima, came on board in 2010 to develop a menu inspired by the cuisine of Calabria.

The celebrity chef series continued in 2012 with the introduction of two pizzas made by television cook Valentine Warner. Warner introduced the fennel and salami pizza and the puttanesca pizza.

Music

PizzaExpress has supported the jazz community from its early days when it opened its first jazz club in 1969 in Dean Street, London. Since then, artists performing there have included Ella Fitzgerald and Amy Winehouse, to supporting early performances by Norah Jones and Jamie Cullum.

Za
Za is a brand of PizzaExpress offering a more casual version of the pizzeria in the United Kingdom.
The first restaurant was launched at the Fenchurch Street site in February 2019. The opening of Za is part of a five-year plan to refresh and improve the brand, called Future Express. 
The menu is centered on PizzaExpress pizzas, sold by the slice, but also with the same toppings available in a wrap made from PizzaExpress dough. The brand focuses on breakfast, with flat breads, bacon, eggs or spinach. Piadina and salads form part of the lunch menu and the site is fully licensed.

The Fenchurch Street test location closed in December 2019, but PizzaExpress have committed to bringing Za back in a different location as of 2022.

Design and art
Peter Boizot commissioned Italian restaurant designer and cartoonist Enzo Apicella in the 1960s to design the PizzaExpress identity and over 80 restaurants.

In 2002, PizzaExpress launched PizzaExpress Prospects Contemporary Art Prize with pop artist Peter Blake. Peter Blake's connection with PizzaExpress was extended when he donated 26 original pieces to the Chiswick restaurant.

PizzaExpress created a 'Living Lab' in October 2010, in Richmond, trialling new ideas from design to sound, collaborating with designer Ab Rogers.

Philanthropy
PizzaExpress introduced the Pizza Veneziana in 1977 to help save Venice from sinking by donating 5p of every pizza sold to the Venice in Peril Fund. Over the years the amount donated from each pizza has increased to 25p. From 2008, donations from the Veneziana pizza go to the Veneziana Fund, where 50% is donated to the Venice in Peril Fund and 50% is given to the restoration, repair and maintenance of buildings, fixtures and fittings of buildings and works of art created before 1750.

In 1999, PizzaExpress introduced its Schools Programme, a programme where the company turns its restaurants into classrooms, educating children about fresh ingredients, how to run a local business and how to cook for themselves.

In 2016, PizzaExpress launched its partnership with Macmillan Cancer Support, with a discretionary 25p donation from every Padana pizza sold to help Macmillan provide essential financial, emotional, medical and practical support for people affected by cancer. As of May 2017, the partnership has raised over £500,000.

Controversy

In 2008, the company was reported as taking an 8% cut of tips paid via credit card.

References

External links

 

1965 establishments in England
Pizza chains of the United Kingdom
Restaurants established in 1965
Restaurant chains in Ireland
Restaurant chains in the United Kingdom
Fast-food franchises
British companies established in 1965
2014 mergers and acquisitions
British subsidiaries of foreign companies